Cook Farm may refer to:

in the United States
(by state then city)
Cook Farm (Charles City, Iowa), listed on the National Register of Historic Places (NRHP)
Cook Farm (Missoula, Montana), listed on the NRHP in Missoula County
John Cook Farm, Harlem, Ohio, listed on the NRHP in Delaware County
Shipley-Cook Farmstead, Lake Oswego, Oregon, listed on the NRHP in Clackamas County
Cook-Bateman Farm, Tiverton, Rhode Island, listed on the NRHP
Fox-Cook Farm, Wallingford, Vermont, listed on the NRHP

See also
Cook House (disambiguation)